Bethel Regional High School (BRHS) is a public high school in Bethel, Alaska, and part of the Lower Kuskokwim School District (LKSD).  it had an enrollment of 500.  it is the LKSD school with the highest enrollment.

History

The Bethel Regional High School shooting took place in 1997. On February 19, 1997, a sixteen-year-old student named Evan Ramsey opened fire in the common area. Ramsey used a Mossberg 500 12-gauge shotgun and shot fifteen-year-old student Josh Palacios in the abdomen, who later died shortly after emergency surgery. Two more students were injured before an art teacher, Reyne Athanas attempted to talk Evan into surrendering. After she failed to do so, Evan walked to the main lobby where he would shoot principal Ron Edwards twice, effectively killing him. He would then return to the common area where he took part in a police shoot out. Following with his original plan, and placed the barrel of the gun under his chin. Although instead of pulling the trigger, he exclaimed twice "I don't want to die," he threw the gun on the ground and surrendered without a struggle.

References

External links
 Bethel Regional High School
 

Bethel, Alaska
Public high schools in Alaska
Schools in Unorganized Borough, Alaska